Joseph Kappel  (April 27, 1857 – July 8, 1929) was a professional baseball player who played outfield in the Major Leagues in 1884 and 1890. He continued to play in the minor leagues through 1896.

External links

1857 births
1929 deaths
Major League Baseball outfielders
Major League Baseball shortstops
Major League Baseball third basemen
Philadelphia Quakers players
Philadelphia Athletics (AA) players
19th-century baseball players
Reading Actives players
Allentown Dukes players
Baltimore Monumentals (minor league) players
Augusta Browns players
Columbus Stars (baseball) players
Binghamton Crickets (1880s) players
Buffalo Bisons (minor league) players
Davenport Hawkeyes players
Terre Haute Hottentots players
Peoria Distillers players
Philadelphia Athletics (minor league) players
Allentown-Bethlehem Colts players
Allentown Colts players
Lancaster Chicks players
Baseball players from Pennsylvania
Bridgeton (minor league baseball) players